Lachnobacterium is a Gram-positive, non-spore-forming and anaerobic bacterial genus from the family of Lachnospiraceae with one known species (Lachnobacterium bovis). Lachnobacterium bovis has been isolated from the rumen and faeces of cattle.

References

Lachnospiraceae
Monotypic bacteria genera
Bacteria genera